SDI may refer to:

Arts and entertainment 
 SDI (arcade game), 1987, by Sega
 S.D.I. (video game), 1986, by Cinemaware

Companies and organizations 
 Samsung SDI, battery manufacturer
 Scottish Development International
 Scuba Diving International
 SDI Media Group, providing subtitling and language services
 SDI Presence, US IT consultancy
 SDI Technologies, a consumer electronics manufacturer, New Jersey, U.S.A.
 Service Desk Institute, for computer help desk staff
 Slum Dwellers International
  (Italian Democratic Socialists), a political party
 Software Design Inc.
Spiritual Directors International, supporting spiritual direction
 Steel Dynamics, Inc., a steel producer, Indiana, US.A.

In science and technology

Computing and telecommunications 
 Serial data input in the Serial Peripheral Interface bus
 Serial digital interface for sending video signals over coaxial cable
 Single document interface, a style of graphical user interface
 Software-defined infrastructure, with no  human intervention
 Spatial data infrastructure
 Standard Disk Interconnect, a DEC standard
 Statistical Design Institute's SDI Tools for Microsoft Excel
 System Deployment Image, a Microsoft disk image file format

Medicine 
 Sulfadimidine, an antibiotic

Other uses in science and technology 
 Selective dissemination of information
 Silt density index in reverse osmosis systems
 Smoke-developed index, the concentration of smoke emitted by a material
 Spiral Dynamics Integral, a model of evolutionary development
 Stand density index, of the stocking of a stand of trees
 Subsurface drip irrigation
 Suction Diesel Injection, a Volkswagen diesel engine

Other uses 
 Saidor Airport (IATA code), in Madang Province, Papua New Guinea
 Socio-Demographic Index of the Global Burden of Disease Study
 State Disability Insurance of California, US
 Strategic Defense Initiative, US anti-missile project